Good law is the concept in jurisprudence that a legal decision is still valid or holds legal weight. A good law decision has not been overturned (during an appeal) or otherwise rendered obsolete (such as by a change in the underlying law). Legal practitioners use good law as part of the basis for making legal arguments. However, there is no universally acceptable method of determining what is considered good law in every legal circumstance.

Sources

External links
Good law defined

Legal ethics
Philosophy of law
Law of the United Kingdom